Kitano Station is the name of two train stations in Japan:

 Kitano Station (Fukuoka)
 Kitano Station (Tokyo)